Christopher Edward Byrne (April 21, 1867 – April 1, 1950) was an American prelate of the Roman Catholic Church. He served as bishop of the Diocese of Galveston in Texas from 1918 until his death.

Biography

Early life 
Christopher Byrne was born in Byrnesville, Missouri, to Patrick and Rose Byrne. After attending the village school where his father taught, he earned a Bachelor of Arts at St. Mary's College in Kansas in 1886. He then studied for the priesthood at St. Mary's Seminary in Baltimore, Maryland.

Priesthood 
Byrne was ordained a priest for the Archdiocese of St. Louis by Archbishop Peter Kenrick in St. Louis on September 23, 1891.  After his ordination, Byrne served as a curate at St. Bridget's Parish in St. Louis. In 1897, he was appointed pastor of Sacred Heart Parish in Columbia, Missouri. Byrne took a medical leave of absence in 1898, moving to San Antonio, Texas, to recuperate. Years later, Byrne said that a doctor had told him when he was age 30 that his heart disease would kill him in a few months.

In 1899, Byrne returned to Missouri to become pastor of St. Joseph's Parish in Edina then went to Holy Name Parish at St. Louis in 1911. He erected churches and schools at every assignment, and for many years he also did editorial work on the Catholic newspaper The Church Progress. He also served as diocesan director of the Holy Name Society and member of the Diocesan School Board.

Bishop of Galveston 
On July 18, 1918, Byrne was appointed the fourth bishop of the Diocese of Galveston by Pope Benedict XV. He received his episcopal consecration on November 10, 1918, from Archbishop John J. Glennon, with Bishops Thomas Lillis and John Morris serving as co-consecrators. Byrne's expressed priority as bishop was vocations, saying, "If Catholicism has not taken that deep hold on the people which will make them dedicate their young to God's service, it cannot endure."  He ordained about 130 priests and received several hundred people into religious communities. The diocese increased from 70,000 to 200,000 parishioners during Byrne's tenure, and the number of schools from 51 to over 100. In 1936, Byrne helped organize the centennial celebration of Texan independence from Mexico, holding an open-air mass at the San Jacinto Battlefield near Houston.

Death and legacy 
Byrne died of a heart attack in Galveston on April 1, 1950, at age 82. He is buried at Calvary Cemetery in Galveston.

References

External links
Roman Catholic Archdiocese of Galveston–Houston
Roman Catholic Archdiocese of St. Louis

1867 births
1950 deaths
People from Jefferson County, Missouri
Roman Catholic bishops of Galveston–Houston
20th-century Roman Catholic bishops in the United States
Saint Mary's Academy and College alumni
St. Mary's Seminary and University alumni
Roman Catholic Archdiocese of St. Louis
Roman Catholic Archdiocese of Galveston–Houston
People from Edina, Missouri
Catholics from Missouri